Aleppo Arabic or Aleppine Arabic is the urban Arabic variety spoken in the city of Aleppo.

Phonology 
Aleppo Arabic is characterised by the usage of /d͡ʒ/ instead of the typical urban /ʒ/ used in Damascus Arabic and in Lebanese Arabic.
It agrees with Lebanese Arabic with its usage of medial imāla which often turns /a:/ into /e:/. Also has /t͡ʃ/, which is not typical of urban Levantine dialects.

References 

North Levantine Arabic